Lazar Koliševski (12 February 1914 – 6 July 2000) was a Macedonian Yugoslav communist political leader in the Socialist Republic of Macedonia and briefly in the Socialist Federal Republic of Yugoslavia. He was closely allied with Josip Broz Tito.

Early years
Koliševski was born in Sveti Nikole, Kingdom of Serbia in 1914. He was from a poor farmer family. Little is known about his parents. According to the society of the Aromanians in North Macedonia, Koliševski's mother was an Aromanian, Bulgarian source claims his father was a Serboman. Per his personal Bulgarian prison card in 1941, both of them were Bulgarian. In 1915, during the First World War, the region was occupied by the Kingdom of Bulgaria. His father was mobilized on the Macedonian front, and during the war, both of Koliševski's parents died. Once left an orphan, after the war, when Vardar Macedonia was ceded to Serbia again, he was taken by his maternal aunts in Bitola. There he was raised up to school age and later was transferred to a state orphanage in the city, where completed his primary education. Later Koliševski was sent to a technical school in Kragujevac. Here, Lazar began to follow politics and learn about communism. Because of the political activities he was arrested and expelled from the munition factory, where he worked. During the 1930s he became a prominent activist of the Yugoslav Communist Party.

World War II

As Nazi forces entered Belgrade in April 1941, Bulgaria, a German ally, took control of a part of Vardar Macedonia, with the western towns of Tetovo, Gostivar and Debar going to Italian zone in Albania. After the Bulgarians had taken control of the eastern part of the former Vardar Banovina, the leader of the local faction of Communist Party of Yugoslavia, Metodi Shatorov had defected to the Bulgarian Communist Party. The Bulgarian Communists avoided organizing mass armed uprising against the authorities, but the Yugoslav communists insisted on an armed revolt. Meanwhile, the German invasion of the Soviet Union convinced the Comintern and Joseph Stalin to decide that the Macedonian communists were to join the Yugoslav communists.

In the fall of 1941, Koliševski thus became the Secretary of the Regional Committee of the Communists in Macedonia. On the ground, he began to pursue Shatorov's sympathisers and organised several small armed detachments against the Bulgarian authorities and their local adherents. In late 1941, he was arrested and sentenced to death by a Bulgarian military court. He wrote two appeals for clemency to the Bulgarian tsar and to the defence minister. There he regrets the accomplishment, insisting on his Bulgarian origin. These documents are stored in the Bulgarian military archive in Veliko Tarnovo. Later, after an intercession of the Defense Minister to the tsar, his death sentence was commuted to life imprisonment, and Koliševski was sent to a prison in Pleven, Bulgaria. However, after the fall of communism, when these documents became widely known, Koliševski denied making any appeals for clemency or admission of guilt personally. He claimed that his plea for mercy was written by his lawyer, but in relation to the death sentence of the then Bulgarian military courts, existed only the opportunity to submit personally signed "appeal for clemency". According to the Yugoslav politician Antun Kolendić, Koliševski vainly denied these facts, while he became familiar with these documents in 1946. It is claimed that in 1943, he was elected in absentia as secretary of the Central Committee of the new Communist Party of Macedonia and a delegate to the AVNOJ's second session in 1943, and also to the ASNOM convened in August 1944, but those claims are disputed.

In September 1944, Koliševski was freed by the new Bulgarian pro-communist government, and soon became the Chairman of the Communist Party of Macedonia, a local division of the Communist Party of Yugoslavia. Near the end of the war Koliševski became the Prime Minister of the Federal State of Macedonia, a federal unit of the Democratic Federal Yugoslavia (DFY). It was essentially the highest office in the Federal State of Macedonia. For his efforts in the war, Koliševski was one of the many Macedonians who were awarded with the People's Hero of Yugoslavia medal.

Yugoslavia

After World War II, Koliševski became the most powerful person in PR Macedonia and among the most powerful people in all of Yugoslavia. Under his leadership, hundreds of people of Macedonian Bulgarian descent were killed as collaborationists between 7–9 January 1945. Thousands of others, who retained their pro-Bulgarian sympathies, suffered severe repression as a result. Kolisevski strongly supported the promotion of a distinct ethnic Macedonian identity and language in SR Macedonia. Some circles were then trying to minimise ties with Yugoslavia as far as possible and promoted the independence of Macedonia. Kolishevski, however, started a policy of fully implementing the pro-Yugoslav line and took harsh measures against the opposition. He also began massive economic and social reforms. Koliševski finally brought the Industrial Revolution to Macedonia. By 1955, the capital, Skopje, had become one of the fastest-growing cities in the region and became the third-largest city in Yugoslavia. Thanks to Koliševski's reforms, the small republic that in 1945 had been the poorest area of Yugoslavia became the fastest-growing economy. After the second Five-Year Economic Plan, PR Macedonia's economy advanced rapidly.

On 19 December 1953, Koliševski retired as the Prime Minister of PR Macedonia and assumed the office of President of the People's Assembly. He became the PR Macedonian head of state, but wielded less direct political power. However, he remained the Chairman of the League of Communists of Macedonia, the Macedonian division of the League of Communists of Yugoslavia, which were the new names of the communist parties in Yugoslavia. He was still the most powerful person in the Republic because of his influence in the Yugoslav Communist Party. With his slow removal from politics in Macedonia, he began to travel to other nations as a Yugoslav diplomat. He made many major trips in the late 1950s and the early 1960s to Egypt, India, Indonesia and other nations that later formed the Non-Aligned Nations. The diplomatic travels showed that Koliševski was very trusted by the Yugoslav leader, Josip Broz Tito. Even after Tito had fallen out with some of his most trusted allies, Koliševski remained in his position.

After the Yugoslav Constitution of 1974 was passed, Koliševski became much more influential in the Yugoslav political world. The new constitution called for a rotating Yugoslav Vice-Presidency. Koliševski was chosen by the Macedonian leadership to be the Macedonian representative to the Presidency. On 15 May 1979, Koliševski was voted by the other presidency members to become President of the Presidency and Vice President of Yugoslavia. On New Year's Day in 1980, Tito fell ill, leaving Koliševski in the role of acting leader in his absence. Tito died five months later, on 4 May 1980. Koliševski held the office of acting head of the presidency of Yugoslavia for another ten days, when the office passed on to Cvijetin Mijatović.

Macedonia
After the breakup of Yugoslavia, Koliševski lived in Skopje, the capital of the newly-proclaimed Republic of Macedonia, and opposed the anti-Serbian and pro-Bulgarian policy of the ruling right-wing party, VMRO-DPMNE, in the late 1990s. He died on 6 July 2000. Shortly after, his personal archive of 300,000 documents was given to the Macedonian Academy of Arts and Sciences. In 2002 a monument of Koliševski was erected in his birthplace by the left-wing local government.

See also
Titoism
Socialist Federal Republic of Yugoslavia
Socialist Republic of Macedonia

References

External links

Аспекти на македонското прашање, Лазар Колишевски. 
Picture – From left to right, Lazar Koliševski (in Glasses), Josip Broz Tito, Milka Planinc, Azem Vllasi and General Kosta Nadj
Letter by Koliševski on the Macedonian Partisan forces in Pirin Macedonia
 "Сите българи заедно." Tsocho Bilyarski, Little known facts about  the life of Lazar Koliševski. (in Bulgarian) Contains  pictures of original documents signed by Koliševski, kept in Sofia.

1914 births
2000 deaths
People from Sveti Nikole
People from the Kingdom of Serbia
Macedonian atheists
Yugoslav communists
Socialist Republic of Macedonia
Recipients of the Order of the People's Hero
League of Communists of Macedonia politicians
Presidents of the Socialist Federal Republic of Yugoslavia
Recipients of the Order of the Hero of Socialist Labour